Saint-Amant-Roche-Savine is a commune in the Puy-de-Dôme department in Auvergne in central France. The nearest city is Ambert.

See also
Communes of the Puy-de-Dôme department

References

Saintamantrochesavine